The Vermont State Board of Education supervises, and manages the Department of Education and the public school system. The board makes regulations governing attendance and records of attendance of all pupils; standards for student performance, adult basic education programs, approval of independent schools, disbursement of funds, and equal access to education for all Vermont students. The governor appoints the board with approval by the senate. 

The board selects the Education Commissioner. The commissioner runs a department of 200 employees. The commissioner was paid a salary of $96,907 in 2008.

Commissioners
Raymond J. McNulty
Richard Cate 2003-2009
 Armando Vilaseca 2009-

References

External links 
 Official website

State Board of Education
Board of Education
Vermont